Kiasar (also Romanized as Kīāsar, Keyāsar, and Kīya Sar) is a city and capital of Chahardangeh District, in Sari County, Mazandaran Province, Iran.  At the 2006 census, its population was 3,590, in 913 families.

References

Populated places in Sari County

Cities in Mazandaran Province